The effects of Hurricane Jeanne in the Mid-Atlantic region of the United States included two fatalities and $530 million (2004 USD; $  USD) in damage. Originating from a tropical wave off the coast of Africa in early September 2004, Hurricane Jeanne tracked through the Leeward Islands and Hispaniola for several days, resulting in extensive damage and an immense loss of life. After completing a clockwise loop between September 22 and 24, the storm intensified into a major hurricane before striking the Bahamas and Florida. Substantially weaker, the system turned northeastward over Georgia before affecting Delaware, District of Columbia, Maryland, New Jersey, New York, Pennsylvania, Virginia, and West Virginia; all of those states are in the Mid-Atlantic region of the United States. By the evening of September 26, the Hydrometeorological Prediction Center took over responsibility of monitoring the former hurricane over Virginia.

Throughout September 28 and much of the following day, the remnants of Jeanne produced heavy, flooding rains in many states. Severe weather associated with the storm also resulted in isolated tornadoes in a few states. Overall damage was severe, with Pennsylvania suffering nearly $300 million (2004 USD; $  USD) in losses alone. Two fatalities were also linked to the passage of Jeanne, one in both Virginia and Pennsylvania. Damage in the Mid-Atlantic states was estimated at $530 million (2004 USD; $  USD)

Meteorological background

Hurricane Jeanne was first identified by the National Hurricane Center (NHC) on September 7, 2004 as a tropical wave off the coast of Africa. This system tracked west-northwest at a relatively slow pace, eventually reaching the Leeward Islands on September 13. By this point, the wave had developed into a tropical depression, the eleventh of the season. Continuing its west-northwest track, the depression intensified into Tropical Storm Jeanne before crossing Puerto Rico and attained hurricane intensity before making another landfall over the eastern tip of the Dominican Republic. After briefly weakening to a tropical depression off the coast of Haiti, Jeanne turned sharply northward and regained tropical storm status. During this loop, Jeanne re-attained hurricane status although it fluctuated in intensity due to the upwelling of cooler waters. By September 24, the storm maintained a steady westward track and reached Category 3 strength on the Saffir–Simpson hurricane scale.

The hurricane gradually weakened to a tropical storm as it remained over the Florida peninsula. After turning northward and moving over Georgia, Jeanne weakened to a tropical depression and accelerated northeastward towards the Mid-Atlantic region. As the storm neared the Atlantic Ocean, it began to transition into an extratropical cyclone. Several hours later, the remnants of Jeanne merged with a frontal system in the same region. The system was last noted by the Hydrometeorological Prediction Center (HPC) on September 30 as the extratropical system moved towards Atlantic Canada.

Preparations

After the NHC issued their final advisory on Jeanne on September 27 as it weakened to a tropical depression, the HPC took over responsibility of warning the public of the storm. That evening, flood watches were issued for much of the southeastern United States as well as parts of southern Virginia. Several hours later, additional flood watches were posted for southeastern New York and northeastern Pennsylvania. The HPC issued flood warnings in several counties of southeastern Virginia, as heavy rainfall moved into that are. Additionally, most areas between Georgia and southern New York, especially along the Appalachian Mountains, were under flood or flash flood watches. Throughout September 28, larger portions of the Mid-Atlantic region recorded moderate to heavy rainfall, prompting the issuance of more flash flood warnings.

While the storm was moving through southeastern Virginia, the Storm Prediction Center (SPC)  issued a tornado watch for areas around Delaware Bay on September 28. The threat for tornadoes was possible as the moist air mass brought northward from the remnants of Hurricane Jeanne encountered cooler air in a region with high-level wind shear. The combination of these factors produced conditions favoring the development of tornadic thunderstorms. Several hours later, a second tornado watch was issued for areas along the northern shore of Delaware Bay through southern New Jersey. Flood watches were also extended northward into Massachusetts as Jeanne continued moving through the eastern United States. Several hours after Jeanne moved just offshore of the southern New Jersey coastline on September 29, the National Weather Service discontinued all flood and flash flood watches associated with the storm; however, one county in New Jersey remained under a flood warning for a few more hours.

Impact

In comparison to the widespread damage sustained in the Florida Peninsula, the effects of Jeanne's remnants in the Mid-Atlantic region were relatively minor. Most damage resulted from flash flooding. However, two fatalities were linked to Jeanne's remnants.

Virginia and West Virginia
Heavy rainfall from the storm fell along the mountainous regions in the western portion of Virginia. Numerous side roads and a few main roads were washed out during the floods in Clarke County. Portions of Interstate 81 and U.S. Route 50 were blocked off by flood waters. At the height of the storm, emergency officials had closed portions of 435 roads. In Patrick County, one fatality took place after a mobile home was washed off its foundation and moved downstream. Another building and several vehicles were also moved in the flood. Several rivers across the state rose above flood stage, with the most significant rise occurring along the James River. In Roanoke, the Roanoke River reached its seventh highest level on record, prompting numerous residential evacuations. Businesses near the river were completely submerged underwater, and a nearby hotel required evacuation. In Rockbridge County, 30 students were stranded after flooding cut off roads to their school. Minor flooding continued along the rivers through September 30, two days after the floods began. A long-lived F1 tornado touched down in Pittsylvania County and tracked along an intermittent  path. Minor damage took place throughout the tornado's existence and one person sustained injuries as a result. Throughout the state, 282 structures were damaged or destroyed by Jeanne and $50 million (2004 USD; $  USD) was left in losses.

As a result of these rains, minor flash flooding occurred along several primary and secondary roads, including U.S. Route 11 and West Virginia Route 51. Most of the flooding took place in eastern areas of the state and lasted through the evening of September 28.

Maryland and Delaware

Numerous roads were flooded, including parts of Maryland Route 17. A total of 50 roads were closed due to high water throughout the state. Numerous reports of stranded vehicles were sent to the Emergency Operations Center. In Carroll County, a group of inmates required rescue after the jail they were in flooded. One brief F0 tornado touched down in the state near Solomons, causing minor damage. Strong winds associated with thunderstorm that produced the F0 tornado caused a barn to collapse and the roof of another structure to cave in. In all, Jeanne left $40 million in losses throughout Maryland.

This led to widespread street flooding and several rivers overflowed their banks. A strong F2 tornado touched down in the state, injuring five people and leaving $1 million (2004 USD; $  USD) in damages. The county airport sustained significant damage, five C-130 cargo planes were damaged, thousands of pounds of jet fuel spilled, and damaged hangars. At a nearby industrial park, metal siding was torn off buildings, windows were shattered and power lines were downed. A self-storage facility sustained substantial damage. In all, Jeanne left $40 million (2004 USD; $  USD) in losses throughout Delaware.

New Jersey
Throughout New Jersey, widespread moderate rainfall was recorded due to the interaction of Jeanne's remnants and an approaching frontal system. Despite the high rainfall totals, flooding in most areas was limited due to the sporadic nature of the rain, allowing many rivers to remain below flood stage. However, in areas with poor drainage, street flooding did occur. Flash flooding was reported along portions of the Garden State Parkway during the passage of the system. Portions of New Jersey Route 82 were also shut down as a result of standing water. Gusty winds in some areas knocked down trees, some of which fell on homes. Significant flooding was reported along Interstate 280, resulting in cars floating and becoming stranded. In Union County, several homes were evacuated after being inundated by flood waters. In Camden County, a short-lived F0 tornado snapped power poles and damaged trees along a  path. In a shopping center, kiosks set up in the parking lot were tossed by  winds. A heating system was also torn off the roof of two buildings, resulting in a gas leak. In all, eleven homes were damaged by the tornado, leaving $100,000 (2004 USD, $  USD) in losses. Along the shoreline of the Delaware River, the combination of runoff from the heavy rains and high tide led to minor coastal flooding. In all, Jeanne left $40 million (2004 USD; $  USD) in losses throughout New Jersey.

Pennsylvania and New York

Continuing northward, heavy rains from Jeanne spread into Pennsylvania, bringing further floods to the already storm-stricken state. Already saturated by the remnants of Hurricanes Frances and Ivan, soil across the state was unable to hold much additional moisture, resulting in widespread flooding. Numerous creeks, streams and rivers overflowed their banks and inundated nearby areas. Numerous roads across the state were shut down due to high waters. In Philadelphia, flash flooding resulted in one fatality after a woman was swept away by swift currents while trying to board a SEPTA bus. Six people attempted to rescue her, however, she became trapped under a pickup truck and drowned. Several abandoned buildings in the city also collapsed. A commuter train carrying 400 people was evacuated after passengers felt uneasy due to loose soil underneath the rails. One of the major roadways connecting Philadelphia with a western suburb was shut down after more than  covered portions of it. Several water rescues had to be made along the road after residents became trapped in flood waters. Additionally, several schools were closed on September 29 due to hazardous conditions. In all, Jeanne left $290 million (2004 USD; $  USD) in losses throughout Pennsylvania.

As Jeanne moved offshore into the Atlantic Ocean, it continued to produce heavy rainfall in the Mid-Atlantic region. In New York City, record daily rainfall amounts were recorded in several locations, including Central Park and Kennedy International Airport which measured  respectively. These rains led to significant travel delays throughout the city and halted subway service on a few lines after water built up on some of the tracks. Portions of the Henry Hudson Parkway were shut down after  of water built up on low-lying portions of the roads. Some areas still recovering from floods earlier in the year were hit hardest by the remnants of Jeanne, leaving some basements flooded. Further north, portions of Interstate 87 were shut down due to flooding in Rockland County. Flash flooding in Tarrytown led to additional road closures. In all, Jeanne left $70 million (2004 USD; $  USD) in losses throughout New York.

Aftermath

On October 18, a major disaster declaration was signed by president George W. Bush to allow emergency disaster funds to be used in parts of Virginia severely affected by Hurricane Jeanne. Under this declaration, the independent cities of Salem and Roanoke, and the counties of Alleghany, Botetourt, Craig, Floyd, Giles, Montgomery, Patrick, and Roanoke could receive these funds from the Federal Emergency Management Agency (FEMA) and other relief groups. Several days later, local relief groups in the commonwealth began assisting residents with debris and mud removal as well as emotional support. On October 29, Internal Revenue Service (IRS) and the Virginia Department of Taxation announced that they would provide deadline extensions for residents in disaster areas in western Virginia. The Virginia Employment Commission also announced that they would be assisting those who lost their jobs with acquiring a new one. Throughout the state, roughly $1.6 million (2004 USD; $  USD) was approved for 964 homeowners and businesses affected by Jeanne. Nearly $600,000 (2004 USD; $  USD) of these funds were granted for Salem City. The disaster declaration and allocated time for fund requests was set to end on December 17 in all counties.

Several months after the passage of Hurricane Jeane, president George W. Bush signed a major disaster declaration for New Castle County, Delaware. This allowed residents affected by the storm to receive government assistance and funds to repair damage and rebuild homes. James N. Russo was designated as the head of the relief efforts in the state by Homeland Security secretary Michael D. Brown.

See also

Hurricane Jeanne
2004 Atlantic hurricane season

References

External links

The Hydrometeorological Prediction Center's Report on Hurricane Jeanne
The National Hurricane Center's Advisory Archive for Hurricane Jeanne
The Hydometeorological Prediction Center's Advisory Archive for Hurricane Jeanne

Hurricane Jeanne
Hurricanes in Delaware
Hurricanes in Virginia
Hurricanes in Maryland
Hurricanes in Washington, D.C.
Hurricanes in New York (state)
Hurricanes in New Jersey
Hurricanes in Pennsylvania
2004 natural disasters in the United States
Environment of the Mid-Atlantic states
Effects of hurricanes in the United States
Jeanne Md At